This is a list of association football or soccer clubs in South Africa
For a complete list see :Category:Soccer clubs in South Africa

A
Addington F.C.
African Wanderers
African Warriors F.C.
African Winners F.C.
Ajax Cape Town F.C.
Als Puk Tawana
AmaZulu F.C.
Arcadia Shepherds F.C.
Atlie FC
Avendale Athletico

B
Baroka F.C.
Batau F.C.
Battswood F.C.
Bay Academy
Bay Stars F.C.
Bay United F.C.
Bid Boys F.C.
Bidvest Wits F.C.
Black Leopards F.C.
Blackburn Rovers FC (South Africa)
Blackpool F.C. (South Africa)
Bloemfontein Celtic F.C.
Bloemfontein Young Tigers
Bush Bucks F.C. (2007)

C
Carara Kicks F.C.
Celtic Colts
Chippa United F.C.

D
Durban City F.C. (2009)
Durban Stars F.C.
Durban United F.C.
Dynamos F.C. (South Africa)

E
East London United F.C.

F
F.C. Cape Town
FC AK
FC Buffalo (South Africa)
Free State Stars F.C.

G
Garankuwa United F.C.
Germiston Callies F.C.

Heroes Futbol Association S.A. 
Hanover Park F.C.
Highlands Park F.C.
Hellenic FC

I
Ikapa Sporting F.C.

J
Jomo Cosmos F.C.

K
Kaizer Chiefs F.C.

L
Lamontville Golden Arrows F.C.
Louisvale Pirates
Lusitano F.C.

M
M Tigers F.C.
Maluti FET College F.C.
Mamelodi Sundowns F.C.
Magesi F.C.
Maritzburg F.C.
Maritzburg United F.C.
Michau Warriors
Mighty Birds
Milano United F.C.
Mitchells Plain United F.C.
Moroka Swallows F.C.
Mother City F.C.
Mpumalanga Black Aces F.C.
Nathi Lions F.C.
NMMU F.C.

O
Orlando Pirates F.C.
OR Tambo Cosmos

P
Parkhurst Academy
Platinum Stars F.C.
Polokwane City F.C.
Polokwane United FC
Port Elizabeth Blackpool
Pretoria
Pretoria Callies F.C.

R
Rabali Blackpool
Rangers F.C. (Johannesburg)
Real Madrid (South Africa)
Roses United F.C.
Royal AM

S
Santos F.C. (South Africa)
Saxon Rovers F.C.
Sivutsa Stars F.C.
Sobantu Shooting Stars
SuperSport Tottenham Hotspur Academy
SuperSport United F.C.

T
Tembu Royals FC
Thanda Royal Zulu F.C.

U
United FC (South Africa)

V
Vasco da Gama (South Africa)

W
Western Province United F.C.

References

 
clubs
South Africa
Football clubs